The 13th Infantry Brigade was a formation of the Royal Hungarian Army that participated in the Axis invasion of Yugoslavia during World War II.

Organization 
Structure of the division:

 Headquarters
 7th Infantry Regiment
 37th Infantry Regiment
 13th Artillery Regiment
 13th Independent Cavalry Squadron
 13th Anti-Aircraft Battery
 13th Signal Company
 13th Service Regiment
 Attached Mining Section

Commanders
13th Infantry Brigade
Brigadier General Gyula Nagy (23 Jan 1939 - 1 Mar 1940)
Brigadier General Pál Platthy (1 Mar 1940 - 17 Feb 1942)
13th Light Division
Brigadier General Pál Platthy  (17 Feb 1942 - 1 Apr 1942)
Brigadier General József Grassy  (1 Apr 1942 - 15 Nov 1942)
Brigadier General László Hollósy-Kuthy  (15 Nov 1942 - 1 Feb 1943)
None  (1 Feb 1943 - 15 May 1943)
Brigadier General Frigyes Vasváry  (15 May 1943 - 10 Aug 1943)
13th Infantry Division
Brigadier General Károly Ungár  (10 Aug 1943 - ? Mar 1944)
Colonel János Markóczy  (30 Mar 1944 - 1 Apr 1944)
Brigadier General Dr. Gygula Hankovszky  (1 Apr 1944 - 16 Oct 1944)
Brigadier General Jénö Sövényházi-Herdiczky  (16 Oct 1944 - 20 Dec 1944)
Colonel Sándor Vályi  (20 Dec 1944 - 27 Nov 1944)

Notes

References

 

Military units and formations of Hungary in World War II